Hafnium carbide (HfC) is a chemical compound of hafnium and carbon. Previously the material was estimated to have a melting point of about 3,900 °C. More recent tests have been able to conclusively prove that the substance has an even higher melting point of 3,958 °C exceeding those of tantalum carbide and tantalum hafnium carbide which were both previously estimated to be higher. However, it has a low oxidation resistance, with the oxidation starting at temperatures as low as 430 °C. Experimental testing in 2018 confirmed the higher melting point yielding a result of 3,982 (±30°C) with a small possibility that the melting point may even exceed 4,000°C.

Atomistic simulations conducted in 2015 predicted that a Hf-C-N material could have a melting point exceeding even that of hafnium carbide. More recent experimental evidence gathered in 2020 confirmed that hafnium carbonitride did indeed have a higher melting point exceeding 4,000 °C.

Hafnium carbide is usually carbon deficient and therefore its composition is often expressed as HfCx (x = 0.5 to 1.0). It has a cubic (rock-salt) crystal structure at any value of x.

Hafnium carbide powder is obtained by the reduction of hafnium(IV) oxide with carbon at 1,800 to 2,000 °C. A long processing time is required to remove all oxygen. Alternatively, high-purity HfC coatings can be obtained by chemical vapor deposition from a gas mixture of methane, hydrogen, and vaporized hafnium(IV) chloride. 

Because of the technical complexity and high cost of the synthesis, HfC has a very limited use, despite its favorable properties such as high hardness (greater than 9 Mohs) and melting point.

The magnetic properties of HfCx change from paramagnetic for x ≤ 0.8 to diamagnetic at larger x. An inverse behavior (dia-paramagnetic transition with increasing x) is observed for TaCx, despite its having the same crystal structure as HfCx.

See also 
 Tantalum carbide
 Tantalum hafnium carbide
 Hafnium carbonitride

References

Carbides
Hafnium compounds
Rock salt crystal structure
Refractory materials